When Fenugreek or Methi plants are harvested as microgreens  they are referred to as Samudra Methi.

This nomenclature is typical to places in and around Mumbai, in Maharashtra, India. It is grown locally typically in sandy tracts near the sea shore. It derives its name from a conjunction of Samudra (which means ocean in Sanskrit) and Methi (which is the Indian name for fenugreek.

It tastes slightly less bitter than full grown fenugreek and is usually sold in small bunches in local vegetable markets in and around Mumbai.

Cultivation of samudra methi may be related to sea shore degradation and may pose a threat to the environment.

References 

Herbs